The Bade Emirate is a traditional state with headquarters in Gashua, Yobe State, Nigeria. Alhaji Abubakar Umar Suleiman is the 11th Emir of Bade (Mai Bade), turbaned on 12 November 2005.

History

Bade, like many other Nigerian tribes, traced their historical emergence and establishment through the oral sources and a few written documents. The traditions regarding the origin of Bade are common especially among Bade people themselves and their neighbouring communities. It is pertinent to note that the legend of migration of Bade from the East is not only a Bade phenomenon, but also endemic within most of the North-Eastern tribes and most of the parts of Nigeria in general claimed an Eastern origin. But it could be plausible that the Bade people were from Arabia and migrated because of certain unspecified historical forces, which made them settle in present-day Bade Emirate. Moving westwards, they came to Dadigar in present-day Bursari Local Government of Yobe State. There they split into four groups. In a report compiled by Mr Lethem, Assistant District Officer (A.D.O) on Nguru Division, ‘the King had a wife called Walu who bore him four sons; Ago, Muza, Amsagiya and Buyam. At Dadigar, these four brothers resolved to separate each taking a different direction. Ago, the eldest remained where he was and became the ancestor of the Bade (Yerima, 2017). This version is commonly acknowledged by the Bade all over the Emirate. The second son Muza, went north and became the ancestor of Tourek, Amsagiya became ancestors of Kindin while Ngizim descended from Buyam, who went south. The Bade people had settled in their present territory as early as c.1300 (Hogben and Kirk-Greene, 1963), by 1750, they had established their various clan units under their leaders called Dugums. As a result of Kanuri and Fulani attacks, Lawan Babuje of Gid-gid clan sought the support of the other Bade clan chiefs of Dumbari, Dagilwa, Garun-dole, Katamma, Tagali and Gunkwai and forged the Pan-Bade confederation which brought all Bade clans under one leadership and defended themselves against foreign attacks. Bade Fishing Festival is observed at Bade Emirate.    BADE FISHING FESTIVAL
Alternatively known as the Mauyi-Ganga Fishing Festival[1].It started in  Bade Local Government Area of Yobe State in the Northeastern part of Nigeria  during the reign of Mai Aji, initially just as a fishing festival, but over the years it evolved into a full blown fishing and cultural festival.
It has become a historic event to reckon with, steadily growing into a national cultural activity.
The region is made up of fertile river area(Mauyi Gaga Riverside of Gogaram Town) with much irrigation farming going in a small town called Gogaram where the festival usually take place.
 The majority of fishermen are the followers of Islam and also predominantly farmers.
Gogaram is main historic center in Bade Local Government for visitors across the globe[2].
  The main purpose of Bade fishing festival is to nurture unity and help raised the profile of Yobe State as a tourist destination and to improve revenues both at the public and at the individual level. 
HISTORY
The Bade Fishing Festival started in 1938 during the reign of Mai Aji, initially just as a fishing festival, but over the years it evolved into a full blown fishing and cultural festival[3].
Sources familiar with the Mauyi-Ganga or Bade fishing festivals inform that  prior to the resuscitation of the event, each villages in the kingdom carried out its separate fishing festivities; dating back as far as 1956; which was hitherto tagged  the Mauyi-Ganga Fishing Festival, believed to have originated at the Alkamaram River[4].
Record has it that Mauyi-Ganga has its origin in a folklore tied around a drummer from some distant history. According to Alhaji Mamman Suleiman, the Maji Dadi of Bade, who is also Secretary Bade Emirate Council, Mauyi-Ganga were ideas that originated from a drummer in time immemorial.
According to him, there was a huge tamarind tree at the bank of the Mauyi River where rural dwellers usually gathered and played. Narrating the birth of the tradition, Alhaji Suleiman said, “It happened that after having some moments of fun, a drummer had forgotten his drum and was asked by his colleagues as he entered into the village the where about of the drum”, adding A drum was among the valuable items because it has been used to entertain and pass powerful messages among communities.”  The drummer reportedly replied that he was not sure whether he left it at the bank of the river. The villagers were said to have returned to the river in search of the missing drum.
According to reports, the Secretary of Bade Emirate Council said since then, the place was named Mauyi-Ganga and has been utilized to host annual fishing festival, attracting tourists from within and outside the state[5].
Unfortunately, in 1993 or there about, the festivities stopped due to some reason, and now that we are pushing for diversification, the government of Yobe and indeed the people of Bade emirate decided that we should revive this and vitalize the event for the benefit of our people in addition to sustaining our culture[6].
Although the Mauyi-Ganga Fishing Festival was revived in February 2020, after it was last held over 24 years ago, those whose business it is to know say it has been around for 60 years[7].
COMPETITION
On the final day of the festival, a competition is held in which thousands of men line up along the river and at the sound of a gunshot, all of them jump into the river and have an hour to catch the largest fish. The winner with the largest fish usually go for a bidding war with prominent visitors, the one with the highest bidder usually go home with the biggest catch of the day. Only traditional tools are allowed in the competition[8].
PURPOSE
According to Bade Emerate council members, “The fishing festival is an additional way of getting revenue for our people, creating employment opportunities and wealth, and of course for our state, it is going to be beneficial for revenue generation in the form of the Internally Generated Revenue (IGR)."
It also includes fishing for fun, Unity and Entertainment[9].
2020 BADE FISHING FESTIVAL
The 38th edition since inception,the 2020 festival lasted for two days and involved exhibitions of traditional dances, hunters' displays, spear throwing, swimming on calabash, and fishing competition among others. The person with the biggest catch was given a tricycle popularly known as Keke napep[10].
The festival was witnessed by the Senate President, the Governor of Yobe State including other prominent dignitaries within and outside the State.

Rulers
Rulers of the Emirate:

References

Nigerian traditional states
Yobe State
History of Nigeria
States and territories established in 1818
Emirates